Adam James Susan is a fictional character and the main antagonist of the comic book series (later graphic novel) V for Vendetta, created by writer Alan Moore and illustrator David Lloyd. He is renamed Adam Sutler in the 2005 film adaptation, in which he is portrayed by John Hurt.

Character's background
Adam Susan is the leader of the Norsefire party, and the ruler of the dictatorship that holds Britain in an iron grip. A firm adherent of pure fascism, he values order above all else and sees civil liberties as threats to a secure society. He states early in the novel that he believes in "the destiny of the Nordic race" and despises anyone who is not white, male, Christian and heterosexual. Despite the latter, he disdains all sexual contact as "brutish coupling", and has therefore remained a virgin his entire life.

The graphic novel establishes his backstory. A former police chief constable, upon his entrance into politics he gathers a select few like-minded right-wing extremists into his inner circle, and then exploits the poverty, chaos, and panic that follow a worldwide nuclear war to be elected to power. Once in control, he gives himself the title of "Leader". He bans all art and literature that conflict with the views of the party, criminalizes political dissent, and puts liberals, blacks, Jews, Asians, Muslims and LGBT people into concentration camps.

In order to further monitor the state, Susan takes control of the internal intelligence departments known as the Eye and the Ear, the criminal-investigation department called the Nose, the military police called the Finger, and the propaganda department called the Mouth. These are run by his subordinates, Derek Almond (later Peter Creedy) at The Finger, Conrad Heyer at The Eye, Brian Etheridge at The Ear, Eric Finch at The Nose, and Roger Dascombe at The Mouth. The leaders of these departments run the day-to-day affairs of government with regular oversight from Susan, making the highest council of the Norsefire government—the Head.

From his inner sanctum, he forsakes virtually all human contact, resolving to be feared and respected if he cannot be loved. He reserves the closest thing he can manage to human feeling for Fate, the super-computer which both surveys security and maintains the bureaucracy of his government, loving and worshiping the machine as a goddess; in one scene, it is strongly implied that he masturbates in its presence.

He is not without human qualities, however. His last few moments in the novel reveal him to be a timid, socially inept man who is eager to somehow connect with his people. He recounts his past, including glimpses of his childhood; it is suggested that he was a lonely child who developed an inflated sense of his own power and importance by embracing fascism. He claims that he and Fate are the only "real" beings in existence. Finally, his internal monologue of his memories suggests that he harbors repressed homosexual desires—he finds women strange and ugly, but remembers men with an almost erotic tone.

His rule begins to crumble when a masked terrorist calling himself "V" - a survivor of Larkhill, one of Norsefire's camps - blows up the Houses of Parliament on November 5 (Guy Fawkes Day), and begins to attack public trust in the government with a series of kidnappings, bombings, and disruption of normal television programming for a very public declaration to the people. His defiance gradually inspires the public to rebel against Norsefire's reign. Susan tries desperately to capture and kill the mysterious vigilante, but remains increasingly powerless to stop him. Susan eventually finds out that V has been manipulating the Fate super-computer to express the forbidden emotion of love, driving him further into insanity.

At the end of the series, Susan is shot and killed during a publicity parade by Rosemary Almond, the widow of Derek Almond, Creedy's predecessor. Creedy immediately takes total control of London for a short time before he too is killed by one of his underlings, gangster Alistair Harper, soon resulting in the total collapse of the government.

In other media

Film

In the 2005 film adaptation, the character is named Adam Sutler - a portmanteau of "Susan" and "Hitler" - portrayed by John Hurt. His title is "High Chancellor". The Fate super-computer subplot is not featured in the film version. Here Sutler is described as "a deeply religious man" with a single-minded desire for absolute power.

Sutler is described as "a young and upcoming politician" and "a member of the Conservative Party". At one point he served in the government as Under-Secretary for Defence during the "Saint Mary's crisis." It is unclear if this was before he left the Conservatives to found Norsefire, or whether there was a coalition between the two. Sutler and his cronies develop a bioweapon from medical experimentation on political prisoners to initiate a viral epidemic that kills 80,000 people and blame the attack on terrorists, who are executed. Norsefire and Sutler wins the election by promising to restore law and order to the country and deliver a cure to the virus, a promise delivered as soon as politically expedient. In power, Sutler outlaws political dissent, and has his political enemies and anyone who does not fit his Aryan ideal arrested and deported to extermination camps, such as Larkhill. He supplants the monarch and turns the United Kingdom into a fascist dictatorship. 

When Sutler watches himself lampooned in a farce on a talk show, he is enraged and orders the show's host, Gordon Dietrich, arrested in the dead of night. Dietrich is later executed for possessing a copy of the Quran.  

Sutler blames Creedy for the failure to stop V and threatens to sack him. Intent on securing the leadership for himself, Creedy makes a deal with V to assassinate Sutler. Creedy and his men kidnap Sutler from his bunker and bring him to V in the London Underground. There, Creedy shoots his hated boss in the head at point-blank range.

As in the graphic novel, Sutler lives in an underground bunker in self-imposed exile and leaves the day-to-day operation of his empire to his lieutenants. For most of the film he is only seen on television and via videophones, until the end when he finally appears in person.

Notes and references

Fictional dictators
Fictional hermits
Fictional mass murderers
Fictional politicians
Fictional prime ministers of the United Kingdom
Fictional murdered people
V for Vendetta characters
Superhero film characters
Comics characters introduced in 1982
Characters created by Alan Moore
Fictional English people
Male film villains
Male characters in film
Male characters in comics
Bioterrorism in fiction
Action film villains